Alberto Miño (born 21 August 1990) is an Ecuadorian table tennis player. He competed in the 2020 Summer Olympics.

References

1990 births
Living people
Sportspeople from Guayaquil
Sportspeople from Düsseldorf
Table tennis players at the 2020 Summer Olympics
Ecuadorian male table tennis players
Olympic table tennis players of Ecuador
Table tennis players at the 2015 Pan American Games
Pan American Games medalists in table tennis
Pan American Games bronze medalists for Ecuador
Table tennis players at the 2011 Pan American Games
Medalists at the 2011 Pan American Games
21st-century Ecuadorian people